Ceppo Morelli is a comune (municipality) in the Province of Verbano-Cusio-Ossola in the Italian region Piedmont, located about  northeast of Turin and about  west of Verbania, on the border with Switzerland.

Ceppo Morelli borders the following municipalities: Antrona Schieranco, Bannio Anzino, Carcoforo, Macugnaga, Saas Almagell (Switzerland), Vanzone con San Carlo.

References

Cities and towns in Piedmont